John E. Bardgett, Sr. (1927–2008) was a judge on the Missouri Supreme Court from 1970 until 1982.

Early life 
Bardgett was born on April 28, 1927, in Richmond Heights, Missouri, to Alfred and Katherine Bardgett. He attended Little Flower Catholic Grade School, St. Louis University and the St. Louis University School of Law. Bardgett was also in the United States Navy.

Career 
Bardgett was a noted attorney in St. Louis and Jefferson City, Missouri. He was appointed to the Missouri Supreme Court by Governor Warren E. Hearnes in 1970. After stepping down in 1982, he returned to private practice. He remained an attorney for more than 50 years.

Personal life 
Bardgett married Mary Jeanne Branch in 1956. They had three children.

Later life and death 
Bardgett died on November 29, 2008, at the age of 81 at BJC Hospital in St. Louis. He is buried in Resurrection Cemetery in Jefferson City, Missouri.

References

1927 births
2008 deaths
20th-century American lawyers
20th-century American judges
Chief Justices of the Supreme Court of Missouri
Saint Louis University School of Law alumni
Judges of the Supreme Court of Missouri